"Oute Ki Esi" is a CD single by popular Greek artist Marianta Pieridi released in Greece in July 2003 by Universal Music Greece.

Track listing
 "Oute Ki Esi"
 "Mine Dipla Mou"
 "Rotisa"

References

2003 singles
Greek-language songs
Mariada Pieridi songs
Songs with lyrics by Natalia Germanou